Claude Dubois (born October 11, 1931) is a former politician in Quebec, Canada.

Background

He was born on October 11, 1931 in Saint-Michel, Quebec and was a business person.

Mayor

Dubois served as Mayor of Saint-Rémi, Quebec from 1972 to 1976.

Political career

Dubois was elected as a Union Nationale candidate to the provincial legislature in the district of Huntingdon with 42% of the vote in 1976, against Liberal incumbent Kenneth Fraser.

He crossed the floor in 1979 and joined the Liberals.  He was re-elected in 1981 and 1985, but he did not run for re-election in 1989.

He was succeeded by André Chenail.

References

1931 births
Living people
Mayors of places in Quebec
Quebec Liberal Party MNAs
Union Nationale (Quebec) MNAs